Butterfly on a Wheel (US: Shattered, Europe: Desperate Hours) is a 2007 British–Canadian mystery thriller film directed by Mike Barker, co-produced and written by William Morrissey, and starring Pierce Brosnan, Gerard Butler, and Maria Bello. The film's title is an allusion to a line of Alexander Pope's poem "Epistle to Dr Arbuthnot": "Who breaks a butterfly upon a wheel?" The line is usually interpreted as questioning why someone would put great effort into achieving something minor or unimportant, or who would punish a minor offender with a disproportional punishment.

Plot
Chicago residents Neil Randall (Gerard Butler) and his wife, Abby Randall (Maria Bello) have the perfect life and a perfect marriage. With their beautiful young daughter, Sophie, they are living the American dream until Sophie is suddenly kidnapped. Neil and Abby have  no choice but to comply with the abductor's demands. The kidnapper, Tom Ryan (Pierce Brosnan), an apparent sociopath, takes over their lives with the brutal efficiency of someone who has nothing to lose.

In the blink of an eye, Neil and Abby's safe and secure existence is turned upside down. Ryan doesn't want their money and instead wants their life to be systematically dismantled and destroyed, piece by piece.

With time running out, Neil and Abby realise they have to submit to Ryan's challenges over the next 24-hour period. Tom asks them how far will they go to save their child, and gives them a series of tasks to complete before they can have their daughter back. He requires them to withdraw more than $130,000 from their bank which is all the money they have. After they give Tom the money, he burns it and throws into a river along with their wallets. Tom then requires the pair to obtain $300 from nowhere in a part of the town where they don't have any friends. Abby pawns her bracelet and Neil his watch to get the $300. Tom requires Abby to deliver a document to the office of Neil's employer's competitor within 20 minutes, and Tom shows Neil a copy of document that contains details of Neil's hacking into customer accounts, which if leaked will ruin Neil. Neil watches Abby deliver the document from a distance. Neil and Abby think that Sophie is being held in a hotel, and they try to rescue her, only to get caught by Tom. As punishment, Tom makes Abby take off her dress and put on an enticing short dress in front of both him and Neil.

Tom has one last test for Neil to save Sophie, in which he requires Neil to enter a house and kill the occupant - a co-worker named Judy who Neil has been having an affair with. Neil is greeted warmly by Judy, and is desperately confused as he sees a picture of Tom on the mantel and learns that Tom and Judy are married. Tom enters the house and tells Neil to shoot Judy or he will kill Neil's daughter Sophie. Neil pulls the trigger but the gun isn't loaded. Tom reveals he knows about their affair and tells Neil his daughter is safe at home.

As they return home, Neil lies to Abby and tells her that his boss was having an affair with Judy and Tom mistook Neil for that person, which is why Tom had tormented them the whole day. When they return home, Sophie is asleep and has been there the whole time. Abby reveals to Neil that their daughter had never been kidnapped, and Tom had concocted the entire day to let Neil experience for one day the pain he has undergone. Neil says that Abby has ruined his career by delivering the document to the competitor's office, but she tells him it was blank. For 24 hours Abby has paid Neil back a portion of the pain she has experienced since learning of his affair, revealing she was involved in the deception.

Cast

Production
Pierce Brosnan joined the film's cast in late 2005. Maria Bello and Gerard Butler joined production on 19 January 2006.

Filming began in February 2006 and finished in May 2006. Vancouver stands in for Chicago but the production shot in the latter city for landscapes before moving to the United Kingdom for post-production. Filming also took place in Los Angeles.

References

External links
Lionsgate: Shattered
Icon Entertainment: Butterfly on a Wheel

2007 films
2007 independent films
2000s thriller drama films
Adultery in films
British independent films
British mystery thriller films
British thriller drama films
British films about revenge
Canadian independent films
Canadian mystery thriller films
Canadian thriller drama films
Canadian films about revenge
English-language Canadian films
Films about bullying
Films about dysfunctional families
Films directed by Mike Barker
Films set in Chicago
Films shot in Vancouver
Icon Productions films
2000s mystery thriller films
2007 drama films
2000s English-language films
2000s Canadian films
2000s British films